Orthotylus blascoi is a species of bug from the Miridae family that is endemic to Spain.

References

Insects described in 1991
Endemic fauna of Spain
Hemiptera of Europe
blascoi